Martin B. "Marty" Morantz  (born April 7, 1962) is a Canadian lawyer, businessperson, philanthropist and politician from Winnipeg. He has served in the House of Commons of Canada as Member of Parliament representing the riding of Charleswood—St. James—Assiniboia—Headingley since the 2019 Canadian Federal Election. Morantz ran as the Conservative candidate, unseating Liberal incumbent Doug Eyolfson in the riding.

Prior to serving in the House of Commons, Morantz served as city councillor for the Charleswood-Tuxedo-Whyte Ridge ward on Winnipeg City Council from 2014 to 2018 after his win in the 2014 Winnipeg municipal election. During his time on City Council, Morantz chaired both the Finance and Infrastructure committees and also served on the Executive Policy Committee.

In 2011, Morantz secured the Progressive Conservative Party of Manitoba nomination in River Heights. He ran in the 2011 Manitoba general election against incumbent, the then Manitoba Liberal Party leader, Jon Gerrard. He won more than eight percentage points more than the party's candidate in the riding had won in the 2007 provincial election but he came second to Gerrard.

Early life and education
Morantz earned a Bachelor of Arts in Political Studies at the University of Manitoba. Following this, he attended Osgoode Hall at York University in Toronto to acquire his law degree. He spent twenty-three years as a partner at a downtown Winnipeg law firm.

In 2009, Morantz became president of Jernat Investments Ltd., a property investment and financial services firm with holdings primarily in multi-unit apartment buildings.

Morantz has also served on the boards of many community groups, including those focused on autism advocacy and research, assisted living, and numerous groups in the Jewish community.

Parliamentary work
Morantz has served as a member of the Canadian House of Commons Standing Committee on Foreign Affairs and International Development and the House of Commons Standing Committee on Finance. In 2020, he served as the Conservative Shadow Minister for National Revenue, focused on CRA-related matters.

In September 2020, Morantz became a member of the multipartisan Interparliamentary Task Force on Combatting Online Antisemitism with elected officials from other countries across the world. 

In November 2020, Morantz introduced Bill C-256, the Supporting Canadian Charities Act. This bill amends the Income Tax Act by providing a similar tax treatment to privately held shares or real estate as is currently given to public shares when the proceeds are donated to a charitable organization. Estimates project this legislation would generate up to $200 million per year in donations, and is widely supported by charitable organizations from across Canada.

Electoral record

Federal

Municipal

Provincial

References

External links

Living people
Winnipeg city councillors
Conservative Party of Canada MPs
Jewish Canadian politicians
Members of the House of Commons of Canada from Manitoba
21st-century Canadian politicians
Lawyers in Manitoba
Businesspeople from Winnipeg
University of Manitoba alumni
Osgoode Hall Law School alumni
1962 births